Hosterman is an unincorporated community in Pocahontas County, West Virginia, United States. The community was originally named Collins; its name was changed to Hosterman in 1902. The community presently has the name of Theodore G. Hosterman, a worker in the local lumber industry.

References

Unincorporated communities in Pocahontas County, West Virginia
Unincorporated communities in West Virginia